Samuel R. Powers (May 26, 1897 – October 14 1969) was a professional football player who was an original member of the Green Bay Packers. He played for the Packers beginning in 1919, two years before the team joined the National Football League. His career ended after the 1921 season.

References
Birth of a Team and a Legend 
1919-1920 Green Bay Packers
Pro-Football-Reference.com

1897 births
1969 deaths
People from Menominee County, Michigan
People from Marinette, Wisconsin
Players of American football from Michigan
Players of American football from Wisconsin
Green Bay Packers players
American football guards
American football tackles